"Bullet with a Name" is a song by American rock band Nonpoint. The song is the opening track on the band's fourth studio album To the Pain and was released as the album's first single. The song is one of Nonpoint's most popular tracks and is usually played as the band's closing song when performed live.

"Bullet with a Name" peaked at #22 on the Billboard Mainstream Rock chart on March 11, 2006.

Music video
The song's music video was directed by Darren Doane.

Use in other media
"Bullet with a Name" was included on the soundtrack for the 2006 video game WWE SmackDown vs. Raw 2007. The song was featured in the 2007 film The Condemned, but did not appear on the film's soundtrack.

Charts

Personnel
 Elias Soriano – lead vocals
 Andrew Goldman – guitars, backing vocals
 Ken MacMillan – bass
 Robb Rivera – drums

References

External links
Official Music Video at YouTube

2005 songs
2005 singles
Nonpoint songs